Martel may refer to:

People
 Andre Martel (1946–2016), American politician and businessman
 Anne-Marie Martel (1644–1673), founder of what is now the Congrégation des Sœurs de l’Enfant-Jésus.
 James B. Aguayo-Martel, ophthalmologist and pioneer of NMR imaging and spectroscopy
 Charles Martel, Mayor of the Palace of the Franks; victor of the Battle of Tours (732)
 Charles Martel of Anjou, 13th century titular King of Hungary
 Chip Martel (Charles U. "Chip" Martel, born 1953), American computer scientist and bridge player
 Édouard-Alfred Martel, a pioneer of cave exploration
 Frédéric Martel (born 1967), French writer and journalist
 Giffard LeQuesne Martel, British Army engineer involved in development of the tank
 Jan Martel (bridge) (born 1943), American bridge player
 Jan Martel (1896–1966), one of the French sculptors Jan et Joël Martel, twin brothers
 Joël Martel (1896–1966), one of the French sculptors Jan et Joël Martel, twin brothers
 John Martel, a pirate active in the Caribbean around 1716, sometimes called James Martel
 Lucrecia Martel, Argentine film director
 Marcel Martel, Canadian historian
 Marcel Martel (musician) (1925–1999), Canadian country singer-songwriter and composer 
 Nellie Martel, English-Australian suffragist and elocutionist
 Renée Martel (born 1947), Canadian country singer
 Rick Martel, the stage name of a professional wrestler
 Sherri Martel, female professional wrestler
 William Martel, a steward to King Henry I and King Stephen of England
 Yann Martel, a Canadian author
 Zita Martel, Samoan rower

Places
 Martel, Lot, a municipality of the Lot department in France
 Martell, Nebraska, also spelled Martel, United States
 Martel, Ohio, United States

In fiction
Martel (Tales of Symphonia), a fictional goddess in Tales of Symphonia and Tales of Phantasia
Martel (Full Metal Alchemist), from Fullmetal Alchemist

Other uses
 Martel (missile), anti-radar/anti-shipping missile
 Martel College, one of the eleven residential colleges at Rice University, Houston, Texas
 MarTEL (Maritime Tests of English Language), standardised test of maritime English language proficiency

See also 
Martell (disambiguation)